One bowl with two pieces is a slang term that has long been in the vernacular of Hong Kong tea culture, meaning "a bowl of tea with two dim sum". In the past, tea was not offered in a present-day teapot but in a bowl, in Cantonese restaurants. Dim sum was not bite-sized. Instead, quite a number of them were simply big buns such that two of them easily filled up one's stomach. The legendary "雞球大包" (Lit. Chicken Ball Big Bun, meaning a bun with chicken filling) serves as an excellent example. This saying, however, is now rendered anachronistic under the heavy influence of the "bite-sized trend".

Chinese tea culture
Culture of Hong Kong
Hong Kong cuisine
Restaurant terminology